Willie Burns (born 10 December 1969) is a Scottish former footballer who played as a defender.

References

1969 births
Living people
Scottish footballers
Association football defenders
Rochdale A.F.C. players
English Football League players